Lobata is an order of Ctenophora in the class Tentaculata with smaller tentacles than other ctenophores, and distinctive flattened lobes extending outwards from their bodies.

Anatomy
The lobates have a pair of lobes, which are muscular, cuplike extensions of the body that project beyond the mouth. Their inconspicuous tentacles originate from the corners of the mouth, running in convoluted grooves and spreading out over the inner surface of the lobes (rather than trailing far behind, as in the Cydippida). Between the lobes on either side of the mouth, many species of lobates have four auricles, gelatinous projections edged with cilia that produce water currents that help direct microscopic prey toward the mouth. This combination of structures enables lobates to feed continuously on suspended planktonic prey.

Lobates have eight comb-rows, originating at the aboral pole and usually not extending beyond the body to the lobes; in species with (four) auricles, the cilia edging the auricles are extensions of cilia in four of the comb rows. Most lobates are quite passive when moving through the water, using the cilia on their comb rows for propulsion, although Leucothea has long and active auricles whose movements also contribute to propulsion. Members of the lobate genera Bathocyroe and Ocyropsis can escape from danger by clapping their lobes, so that the jet of expelled water drives them backwards very quickly.

Unlike cydippids, the movements of lobates' combs are coordinated by nerves rather than by water disturbances created by the cilia, and combs on the same row beat together rather than in Mexican wave style. This may have enabled lobates to grow larger than cydippids and to have shapes that are less egg-like.

An unusual species first described in 2000, Lobatolampea tetragona, has been classified as a lobate, although the lobes are "primitive" and the body is medusa-like when floating and disk-like when resting on the sea-bed.

External links

 
Tentaculata